Gladesville Ryde Magic Football Club is an Australian semi-professional football club based in North Ryde, New South Wales. The club currently has senior squads competing in the NSW League Two and youth squads competing in the NSW National Premier League 2. The club also has a number of junior squads.

Until 2018, the club's home ground was Magdala Park, situated in North Ryde on the leafy Lane Cove River. The 2018 season brought with it the inception of a new home ground, Fortress Magic, at the newly upgraded Christie Park.

Players

First Grade 

 (C)

History
Gladesville Ryde Magic was formed in 1977 by Greek-Australians under the original name of Gladesville United. The club is based in the Northern Suburbs of Sydney and throughout its history the club has been a mainstay of the New South Wales State Leagues.

Colours and badge 
The primary club colours of Gladesville Ryde Magic FC are blue and white. The club crest pays homage to the Greek-Australians who formed the club back in 1977 as well as the Gladesville Bridge, a local steel icon.

Results

Divisional History
 2010–present (10): NSW Division 1, NSW NPL3, NSW League Two (NSW Tier 3)
 2009 (1): NSW Division 2 (Tier 4)
 2003–2008 (6): NSW Division 3 (Tier 5)
 2001–2002 (2): NSW Division 4 (Tier 6)
 2000: Withdrew from NSW competition
 1999: NSW Division 3 (Tier 4)
 1997–1998 (2): NSW Division 2 (Tier 3)
 1995–1996 (2): NSW Division 3 (Tier 4)
 1994: NSW Division 4 (Tier 5)
 1991–1993 (3): NSW Division 5 (Tier 6)

References

Soccer clubs in New South Wales
Association football clubs established in 1977
1977 establishments in Australia